Finland competed at the 1988 Winter Paralympics held in Innsbruck, Austria. In total, athletes representing Finland won nine gold medals, eight silver medals and eight bronze medals and the country finished in 4th place in the medal table.

Biathlon 

In total three medals were won by Finnish competitors:

 Jouko Grip won the gold medal in the Men's 7.5 km LW6/8 event
 Kalervo Pieksaemaeki won the silver medal in the Men's 7.5 km LW4 event
 Pertti Sankilampi won the bronze medal in the Men's 7.5 km LW2 event

Cross-country skiing 

The majority of the country's medals at the games (22 out of 25) were won in cross-country skiing.

See also 

 Finland at the Paralympics
 Finland at the 1988 Summer Paralympics

References 

1988
1988 in Finnish sport
Nations at the 1988 Winter Paralympics